R$ may refer to:

Brazilian real, the official and current currency of Brazil
Rhodesian dollar, the former currency of Rhodesia
Robux, the currency on the video game site in Roblox